Johannes "Hans" Oerlemans (born October 8, 1950 in Eethen) is a Dutch climatologist specialized in glaciology and sea level. He has been a professor of meteorology in the Faculty of Physics and Astronomy at Utrecht University since 1989.

He was elected a member of the Royal Netherlands Academy of Arts and Sciences in 1994. In 2001 he won the Spinoza Prize. In 2010 he was made a Knight of the Order of the Netherlands Lion.

References

External links

1950 births
Living people
Dutch climatologists
Knights of the Order of the Netherlands Lion
Members of the Royal Netherlands Academy of Arts and Sciences
People from Altena, North Brabant
Spinoza Prize winners
Utrecht University alumni
Academic staff of Utrecht University